Horseshoe Bay may refer to:

Antarctica 
 Horseshoe Bay (South Georgia), on Barff Peninsula

Australia 
 Horseshoe Bay (New South Wales), on the shore of which Bermagui, New South Wales is situated
 Horseshoe Bay, Queensland, a bay and town on Magnetic ISland
 Horseshoe Bay (South Australia), on the shore of which Port Elliot, South Australia is situated

Bermuda 
 Horseshoe Bay, Bermuda, a beach

Canada 
 Horseshoe Bay, Alberta, a summer village
 Horseshoe Bay, Saskatchewan, a hamlet
 Horseshoe Bay, West Vancouver, a neighbourhood in British Columbia
 Horseshoe Bay ferry terminal, a ferry terminal in British Columbia

United Kingdom 
 Horseshoe Bay, Isle of Wight, at the east end of the headland of Culver Down
 Horseshoe Bay no.2, Isle of Wight, near Bonchurch

United States 
 Horseshoe Bay Wilderness, Michigan
 Horseshoe Bay, Texas, a city